TNFAIP3-interacting protein 2 is a protein that in humans is encoded by the TNIP2 gene. TNIP2  contains multiple amino acid sites that are phosphorylated and ubiquitinated.

References

Further reading